Kineococcus is an Actinomycete genus within the family Kineosporiaceae.

Phylogeny
The currently accepted taxonomy is based on the List of Prokaryotic names with Standing in Nomenclature (LPSN)  and National Center for Biotechnology Information (NCBI)
and the phylogeny is based on 16S rRNA-based LTP release 123 by 'The All-Species Living Tree' Project

References

External links
Kineococcus at BacDive -  the Bacterial Diversity Metadatabase

Actinomycetia
Bacteria genera